The 1912 New York Giants season was the franchise's 30th season. It involved the Giants winning the National League pennant. They were beaten by the Boston Red Sox in the World Series. Fred Snodgrass took most of the blame, as he dropped a fly ball in the deciding contest.

Led by manager John McGraw, the Giants dominated the NL, opening the season 54–11 and building a 16 1/2-game lead by July 3. On the offensive side, they easily led the league in runs scored. Larry Doyle finished fourth in the batting race and was voted league MVP. Chief Meyers had one of the greatest offensive seasons ever for a catcher and was second in batting.

They had arguably the best pitching staff, too. Jeff Tesreau, Hall of Famer Christy Mathewson, and Red Ames finished 1–2–5 in league ERA. Rube Marquard's 18-game winning streak was the top story in baseball.

Taken together with the 1911 and 1913 pennant winners, this team is considered one of the greatest of all-time. It also makes up a good portion of the 1966 book The Glory of Their Times, as Marquard, Meyers, and Snodgrass were three of the players interviewed.

Regular season

Season standings

Record vs. opponents

Roster

Player stats

Batting

Starters by position 
Note: Pos = Position; G = Games played; AB = At bats; H = Hits; Avg. = Batting average; HR = Home runs; RBI = Runs batted in

Other batters 
Note: G = Games played; AB = At bats; H = Hits; Avg. = Batting average; HR = Home runs; RBI = Runs batted in

Pitching

Starting pitchers 
Note: G = Games pitched; IP = Innings pitched; W = Wins; L = Losses; ERA = Earned run average; SO = Strikeouts

Other pitchers 
Note: G = Games pitched; IP = Innings pitched; W = Wins; L = Losses; ERA = Earned run average; SO = Strikeouts

Relief pitchers 
Note: G = Games pitched; W = Wins; L = Losses; SV = Saves; ERA = Earned run average; SO = Strikeouts

Awards and honors

League top five finishers 
Rube Marquard
 NL leader in wins (26)
 #3 in NL in strikeouts (175)

Christy Mathewson
 #2 in NL in ERA (2.12)
 #2 in NL in complete games (27)
 #4 in NL in wins (23)

Chief Meyers
 NL leader in on-base percentage (.441)
 #2 in NL in batting average (.358)
 #4 in NL in slugging percentage (.477)

Red Murray
 #4 in NL in stolen bases (38)

Fred Snodgrass
 #3 in NL in stolen bases (43)

Jeff Tesreau
 NL leader in ERA (1.96)

1912 World Series 

AL Boston Red Sox (4) vs. NL New York Giants (3)

References

External links
1912 New York Giants season at Baseball Reference

New York Giants (NL)
San Francisco Giants seasons
National League champion seasons
New York Giants season
New York G
1910s in Manhattan
Washington Heights, Manhattan